Ismail al-Qabbani (born in 1898 in Asyut Governorate–1963) was an Egyptian reforming educationalist. He introduced to the Egyptian education system the concept of Pragmatism. He was also convinced that education in Egypt should be indigenous and rooted in Egyptian and Arabic culture. He became Dean of the Institute of Education. He established the Journal of Modern Education in 1948 and later became Minister for Education.

See also
 Education in Egypt
 Ali Pasha Mubarak

References

1898 births
1963 deaths
Education reform
People from Asyut Governorate